Jastrzębski (feminine: Jastrzębska, plural: Jastrzębscy) is a Polish-language surname. It is a toponymic surname derived from one of the several Polish locations named Jastrzęby, Jastrzębie, Jastrząbki, etc. Ultimately derived from jastrząb, or "hawk". Variants include Jastrzembski, Jastrząbski, and Yastrzemski. It is Russified as Yastrzhembsky/Yastrzhembskaya.

Notable people with this surname include:

 Andrzej Jastrzębski (born 1939), Polish jazz tuba player
 Maria Jastrzębska (born 1953), Polish-British poet
 Stanisław Jastrzębski, Polish writer
 Włodzimierz Jastrzębski (born 1939), Polish historian and retired professor
  (1920-1989), Polish ethnographer 
 Mirosława Jastrzębska (1921-1982), Polish ethnographer
 Nikolaus von Jastrzembski, birth name of Nikolaus von Falkenhorst (1885-1968), German general
 Dennis Jastrzembski (born 2000), German footballer
 Steve Jastrzembski (1939–2009), American football player
 Sergey Yastrzhembsky (born 1953), Russian politician
 Carl Yastrzemski (born 1939), American baseball player
 Mike Yastrzemski (born 1990), American baseball player

See also
Jastrzębowski

References

Polish-language surnames
Polish toponymic surnames